Mansuri (also Romanized as Manşūrī) is a village in Sar Daq Rural District, Yunesi District, Bajestan County, Razavi Khorasan Province, Iran. At the 2006 census, its population was 582, in 125 families.

References 

Populated places in Bajestan County